Neftchala FK is an Azerbaijani football club based in Neftçala. The club is currently participating in the Azerbaijan First Division. The club is from Neftchala.

History
The club was established in 2004 under the name of Anşad Petrol by Azerbaijani-Malaysian-Turkish joint venture with same name and played in Azerbaijan First Division. In 2011, after company went defunct, club was overtaken by SOCAR Petroleum and changes its name to FK Neftchala.

League and domestic cup history

Current squad

 (captain)

Managers
 Huseyngulu Guliyev (2012)
 Kamal Alakbarov (2012–13)
 Bahram Shahguliyev (2013–2014)
 Kamal Guliyev (2014–present)

References

External links
 FK Neftchala at PFL.AZ

Football clubs in Azerbaijan
2011 establishments in Azerbaijan
Association football clubs established in 2011
Association football clubs disestablished in 2016
2016 disestablishments in Azerbaijan